The  Cerro del Cubilete ('Dice Cup Hill') is a  tall mountain-hill in Silao Municipality in the state of Guanajuato, Mexico.  At the top of the hill is the Cristo Rey statue.

See also
 List of statues of Jesus

Landforms of Guanajuato
Mountains of Mexico